Lasiobolus cuniculi is a species of coprophilous fungus in the family Ascodesmidaceae. It is known to grow on the dung of sheep, goats and donkeys.

References

External links

Fungi described in 1934
Fungi of Greece
Pezizales